7/8 TV is a Bulgarian private cable television, owned and operated, by the political party There Is Such a People. It was founded in 2019 in Sofia. The television is successor of Television Stara Zagora - its network and signal, and Slavi's Show.

History
On 6 May in Slavi's Show, Slavi Trifonov announced that his show will end on 31 July 2019, and after 15 September Slavi and his team will create their own television. In October 2019, on his Facebook profile, Slavi Trifonov announced when his television will start. The first television broadcast was on the 4 November. On the first day the television started from 19:00 with the following broadcasts: "Studio X" and "The show of the screenwriters". The first episode of "The later show of Slavi Trofonov" was watched by 1,456,120 viewers. The registered office is in the offices of the company Seven-Eight in the so-called. "A little NPC" (Hall 12), but the television uses the studios of Doli Media Studio in Levski G, Sofia.

Broadcasts

Present 
 Krum Savov Live - talk-show with host Krum Savov
 Studio X - is a daily commentary and journalistic program
 The evening show of Slavi Trofonov - a late-night show
 The show of the screenwriters - informational-satirical show
 Tonight with Shkumbata - humorous show with host Dimitar Tudzharov - Shkumbata
 Ivan Kulekov's Evening - a journalistic program of Ivan Kulekov
 Ku-ku Band's Evening - a music show
 Evening of ... - Meetings with celebrities and questions from viewers
 Evening of the Northwest - a comedy show, with specific humor from the Bulgarian region Northwest
 Weather with Ivan Atanasov - meteorological forecast
 4+ - female show
 Let's cook with Radi - culinary show

Former 
 Na ringa - a sport show
 TV DIGEST - a daily entertainment and informational block
 Actors' Evening - humorous show, with main actors Krasimir Radkov, Marian Bachev and Ivo Siromahov and guest actors
 Mate Kitchen - culinary show

References

External links

Television networks in Bulgaria
Television channels and stations established in 2019
Bulgarian-language television stations
Television companies of Bulgaria
Mass media in Sofia